Lepidine, or 4-methylquinoline, is a heterocyclic aromatic organic compound. Its methyl group is fairly acidic, allowing for condensations to occur at this position, especially when the nitrogen is quaternized. It is used in the preparation of certain dyes.

See also 
 Quinaldine, the isomer with the methyl group in position 2.
 Quinoline

Quinolines